The Louis Armstrong Hot Five and Hot Seven Sessions were recorded between 1925 and 1928 by Louis Armstrong with his Hot Five and Hot Seven groups. According to the National Recording Registry, "Louis Armstrong was jazz's first great soloist and is among American music's most important and influential figures. These sessions, his solos in particular, set a standard musicians still strive to equal in their beauty and innovation."  These recordings were added to the National Recording Registry in 2002, the first year of the institution's existence.

Ron Wynn and Bruce Boyd Raeburn, writing for the All Music Guide to Jazz, note that "these recordings radically altered jazz's focus; instead of collective playing, Armstrong's spectacular instrumental (and vocal) improvisations redefined the music." Armstrong helped popularize scat singing in "Heebie Jeebies," and his solo on "Potato Head Blues" helped establish the stop-time technique in jazz.

Recordings

1925–1926 Hot Five recordings 
"My Heart" (Lil Armstrong)
"Yes! I'm in the Barrel"
"Gut Bucket Blues"
"Come Back Sweet Papa" (Paul Barbarin, Luis Russell)
"Georgia Grind" (Spencer Williams)
"Heebie Jeebies" (Boyd Atkins)
"Cornet Chop Suey"
"Oriental Strut" (Johnny St. Cyr)
"You're Next"
"Muskrat Ramble" (Ray Gilbert, Kid Ory)
"Don't Forget to Mess Around" (Armstrong, Barbarin) 
"I'm Gonna Gitcha" (Lil Hardin)
"Droppin' Shucks" (Hardin)
"Who' Sit" (Richard M. Jones)
"He Likes It Slow" (J. Edwards)
"The King of the Zulus" (Lil Armstrong)
"Big Fat Ma and Skinny Pa" (Richard M. Jones)
"Lonesome Blues" (Hardin)
"Sweet Little Papa" (Ory)
"Jazz Lips" (Hardin)
"Skid-Dat-De-Dat" (Hardin)
"Big Butter and Egg Man" (Armstrong, Percy Venable)
"Sunset Cafe Stomp" (Armstrong, Venable)
"You Made Me Love You" (Armstrong, Venable)
"Irish Black Bottom" (Armstrong, Venable)

1927 Hot Seven recordings 
"Willie the Weeper" (Marty Bloom, Walter Melrose, Grant Rymal)
"Wild Man Blues" (Armstrong, "Jelly Roll" Morton)
"Chicago Breakdown" (Morton)
"Alligator Crawl" (Joe Davis, Andy Razaf, Thomas Waller)
"Potato Head Blues"
"Melancholy Blues" (Bloom, Melrose)
"Weary Blues" (Artie Matthews)
"Twelfth Street Rag" (Euday Bowman)
"Keyhole Blues" (Wesley Wilson)
"S.O.L. Blues"
"Gully Low Blues"
"That's When I'll Come Back to You" (Biggs)

1927 Hot Five recordings 
"Put 'Em Down Blues" (E.J. Bennett)
"Ory's Creole Trombone" (Ory)
"The Last Time" (Ewing, Martin)
"Struttin' With Some Barbecue" (Hardin, Don Raye)
"Got No Blues" (Hardin)
"Once in a While" (William Butler)
"I'm Not Rough" (Armstrong, Hardin)
"Hotter Than That" (Armstrong, Hardin)
"Savoy Blues" (Ory)

1928 Hot Five recordings 
"Fireworks" (Spencer Williams)
"Skip the Gutter" (S. Williams)
"A Monday Date" (Earl Hines, Robin)
"Don't Jive Me" (Hardin)
"West End Blues" (King Oliver, C. Williams)
"Sugar Foot Strut" (Pierce)
"Two Deuces" (Hardin)
"Squeeze Me" (Waller, C. Williams)
"Knee Drops" (Hardin)

Recording dates

Personnel

1925–1926 Hot Five recordings

Tracks 1–6 
 Hociel Thomas (voice)
 Louis Armstrong (cornet) 
 Johnny Dodds (clarinet) 
 Hersal Thomas (piano) 
 Johnny St. Cyr (banjo)

Tracks 7–20 
 Louis Armstrong (cornet)
 Kid Ory (trombone) 
 Johnny Dodds (clarinet)
 Lil Hardin Armstrong (piano) 
 Johnny St. Cyr (banjo)

Track 21 
 Joe and Susie Edwards (Butterbeans and Susie) (voice)
 Louis Armstrong (cornet)
 Kid Ory (trombone)
 Johnny Dodds (clarinet)
 Lil Hardin Armstrong (piano)
 Johnny St. Cyr (banjo)

Tracks 22–25 
 Clarence Babcock (voice)
 Louis Armstrong (cornet, voice)
 Kid Ory (trombone)
 Johnny Dodds (clarinet)
 Lil Hardin Armstrong (piano)
 Johnny St. Cyr (banjo)

Tracks 26–27 
 Louis Armstrong (cornet, voice)
 Kid Ory (trombone)
 Johnny Dodds (clarinet)
 Lil Hardin Armstrong (piano)
 Johnny St. Cyr (banjo)

Tracks 28–29 
 May Alix (voice)
 Louis Armstrong (cornet, voice)
 Kid Ory (trombone)
 Johnny Dodds (clarinet)
 Lil Hardin Armstrong (piano)
 Johnny St. Cyr (banjo)

Tracks 30–31 
 Louis Armstrong (cornet, voice)
 Henry Clark (trombone)
 Johnny Dodds (clarinet)
 Lil Hardin Armstrong (piano)
 Johnny St. Cyr (banjo)

1927 Hot Seven recordings

Tracks 32–33 
 Louis Armstrong (cornet)
 John Thomas (trombone)
 Johnny Dodds (clarinet)
 Lil Hardin Armstrong (piano)
 Johnny St. Cyr (banjo)
 Pete Briggs (tuba) 
 Baby Dodds (drums)

Track 34 
 Louis Armstrong (cornet)
 Bill Wilson (cornet)
 Honoré Dutrey (trombone) 
 Boyd Atkins (clarinet, alto saxophone, soprano saxophone) 
 Joe Walker (alto saxophone, baritone saxophone) 
 Albert Washington (tenor saxophone) 
 Earl Hines (piano) 
 Rip Bassett (banjo, guitar) 
 Pete Briggs (tuba)
 Tubby Hall (drums)

Tracks 35–43 
 Louis Armstrong (cornet)
 John Thomas (trombone)
 Johnny Dodds (clarinet)
 Lil Hardin Armstrong (piano)
 Johnny St. Cyr (banjo, guitar)
 Pete Briggs (tuba)
 Baby Dodds (drums)

1927 Hot Five recordings

Tracks 44–50 
 Louis Armstrong (cornet)
 Kid Ory (trombone)
 Johnny Dodds (clarinet)
 Lil Hardin Armstrong (piano)
 Johnny St. Cyr (banjo, guitar)

Tracks 51–52 
 Louis Armstrong (cornet, voice)
 Kid Ory (trombone)
 Johnny Dodds (clarinet)
 Lil Hardin Armstrong (piano)
 Johnny St. Cyr (banjo, guitar)
 Lonnie Johnson (guitar)

1928 Hot Five recordings

Tracks 53–56 
 Lillie Delk Christian (voice)
 Louis Armstrong (trumpet)
 Jimmy Noone (clarinet) 
 Earl Hines (piano)
 Mancy Carr (banjo)

Tracks 57–67 
 Louis Armstrong (trumpet, voice)
 Fred Robinson (trombone) 
 Jimmy Strong (clarinet, tenor saxophone) 
 Earl Hines (piano)
 Mancy Carr (banjo)
 Zutty Singleton (drums)

Tracks 68–70 
 Louis Armstrong (trumpet, voice)
 Fred Robinson (trombone)
 Jimmy Strong (tenor saxophone, clarinet)
 Don Redman (clarinet, alto saxophone) 
 Earl Hines (piano)
 Dave Wilborn (banjo, guitar) 
 Zutty Singleton (drums)

Track 71 
 Louis Armstrong (trumpet)
 Earl Hines (piano)

Track 72 
 Louis Armstrong (trumpet)
 Fred Robinson (trombone)
 Jimmy Strong (clarinet)
 Earl Hines (piano)
 Mancy Carr (banjo)
 Zutty Singleton (drums)

Tracks 73–75 
 Louis Armstrong (trumpet, voice)
 Fred Robinson (trombone)
 Jimmy Strong (clarinet, tenor saxophone)
 Don Redman (clarinet, alto saxophone)
 Earl Hines (piano)
 Mancy Carr (banjo)
 Zutty Singleton (drums)

Track 76 
 Louis Armstrong (trumpet)
 Jack Teagarden (trombone) 
 Happy Caldwell (tenor saxophone) 
 Joe Sullivan (piano) 
 Eddie Lang (guitar) 
 Kaiser Marshall (drums)

Tracks 77–79 
 Louis Armstrong (trumpet, voice)
 J.C. Higginbotham (trombone) 
 Albert Nicholas (alto saxophone) 
 Charlie Holmes (alto saxophone) 
 Teddy Hill (tenor saxophone) 
 Luis Russell (piano) 
 Eddie Condon (banjo) 
 Lonnie Johnson (guitar)
 Pops Foster (bass) 
 Paul Barbarin (drums)

See also 
Hot Fives & Sevens, a box set comprising these sessions

References 

Louis Armstrong albums
United States National Recording Registry recordings